Inter-Asia Cultural Studies is a quarterly peer-reviewed academic journal with the aim of enhancing the communication and exchange between inter-Asia and other regions of the cultural studies world. It was established in 2000 and is published by Routledge. The editors-in-chief are Chen Kuan-Hsing and Chua Beng Huat.

Abstracting and indexing 
The journal is abstracted and indexed in

According to the Journal Citation Reports, the journal has a 2010 impact factor of 0.195.

References

External links 
 

Taylor & Francis academic journals
English-language journals
Cultural journals
Publications established in 2000
Quarterly journals